Praga Tools Limited was established in May, 1943 as Praga Tools Corporation Limited to manufacture machine tools with its headquarters at Kavadiguda, Secunderabad, Telangana, India.

It was renamed as Praga Tools Limited in 1963 and was transferred to the Ministry of Defence in 1963. It is mainly involved in manufacture of machine tools including CNC machines. HMT Limited took over Praga Tools Limited as one of its subsidiaries in 1986. and is under Industries Ministry, The Government of India.

References

External links
Praga Tools on ZaubaCorp

Government-owned companies of India
Machine tool builders
Economy of Secunderabad
Manufacturing companies established in 1943
Defunct manufacturing companies of India
Manufacturing companies disestablished in 2015
Indian companies disestablished in 2015
Indian companies established in 1943